The Theory of Poker is a 1978 book written by David Sklansky. Sklansky has authored or co-authored 13 books on poker. The Theory of Poker is still relevant even after 30 years of its release.  This is considered as very crucial book for the poker player.

History 
It took 30 years to write this book which is based on complex mathematical principles. The first version of the book was released in 1978 under a different title but after various revisions his publisher to release the final version of the book in 1987 This book brings the concepts like expected value, semi-bluffing, optimum bluffing frequency, implied odds and reverse implied odds in the poker.

Content 
This book explains the rules of the poker but does not elaborate much on how to play poker for beginners level. This book helps the player to understand the important and many other dimensions to think in various situations. It looks at the concepts developed in games of poker that help the player ascertain to decide the best move in any situation. These theories and concepts are obvious in all the types of poker game. David Sklansky introduced various new concepts like Fundamental and the concept of theoretical win to the poker world with his Sklansky Bucks model.

References 

1978 books
Poker books